Joseph Woods may refer to:

 Joseph Woods (architect) (1776–1864), English Quaker architect, botanist and geologist
 Joseph Woods (engineer) (1816-1849)
 Joseph Woods (Province of Canada politician)
 Joseph Andrew Woods (1870–1925), politician in Northern Ireland
 Joseph A. Woods Jr. (1925–2013), American lawyer from Alabama
 Joseph Woods (poet) (born 1966), Irish poet

See also  
 Joe Woods (disambiguation)
 Joseph Wood (disambiguation)